2010 International Rally Yorkshire was held on 24–25 September 2010. The Rally headquarters were located in Scarborough, North Yorkshire and was organised by the Trackrod Motor Club. The 2010 International Rally Yorkshire was the final round of the 2010 MSA British Rally Championship and the seventh round of the 2010 MSA British Historic Rally Championship.

Results

Event standings

Special stages

Sources

External links
Official Website

2010 British Rally Championship season